Charles Jacob Grove (born January 22, 1980) is a former American college and professional football player who was a center in the National Football League (NFL) for seven seasons.  He played college football for Virginia Tech, and was recognized as a unanimous All-American.  He was drafted by the Oakland Raiders in the second round of the 2004 NFL Draft, and also played for the NFL's Miami Dolphins.He is now a lineman coach at Jefferson Forest High School.

Early years
Grove was born in Johnson City, Tennessee.  He played high school football at Jefferson Forest High School in Forest, Virginia.

College career
While attending Virginia Polytechnic Institute and State University, Grove played for coach Frank Beamer's Virginia Tech Hokies football team from 2000 to 2003.  As a senior in 2003, he was a first-team All-Big East selection, received unanimous first-team All-American honors, and won the Rimington Trophy, given to the nation's best college center.  In recognition of his outstanding college career as a Hokie, Virginia Tech retired his jersey number in 2006, and enshrined him in the Virginia Tech Sports Hall of Fame.

Professional career

Oakland Raiders
Grove was drafted in the second round (45th overall) of the 2004 NFL Draft by the Oakland Raiders, through a pick that was acquired from the Tampa Bay Buccaneers in exchange for Jon Gruden. where he played from 2004 to 2008. After being the reserve center behind Adam Treu as a rookie, Grove split time with him as the starting center during the 2005 NFL season, in which the Raiders had a 4-12 won-lost record, then won the job the following year, the 7th starting center in Raider history, starting all 16 games, when Treu became his replacement for a 2-14 team. But in the 2007 NFL season, Jeremy Newberry became the starting center, as Grove started only two games for the 4-12 team. He got his job back in the 2008 NFL season, starting in 12 games, though the team's fortune stayed poor with a 5-11 record.  His Oakland tenure was hampered by injuries, and he only played in more than 10 games twice during his six seasons in Oakland.

Miami Dolphins
On March 2, 2009, Grove signed a five-year, $29 million ($14.5 million guaranteed) free agent contract with the Miami Dolphins. The previous starting center for the Dolphins, Samson Satele, was traded to Grove's old team, the Raiders.  Grove suffered through another injury plagued year, playing in 12 games, starting 10 of them.  In the 2010 preseason, he suffered from nagging knee and shoulder injuries, and was cut by the Dolphins less than a year after signing his lucrative free agent contract in favor of Joe Berger.  He reportedly worked out for the Raiders, Baltimore Ravens, Detroit Lions, and New England Patriots, but did not sign with another team.

Notes

External links
Oakland Raiders bio
Miami Dolphins bio

1980 births
Living people
All-American college football players
American football centers
American football offensive guards
Miami Dolphins players
Oakland Raiders players
People from Johnson City, Tennessee
Players of American football from Tennessee
Virginia Tech Hokies football players
Ed Block Courage Award recipients